The United Nations Educational, Scientific and Cultural Organization (UNESCO) World Heritage Sites are places of importance to cultural or natural heritage as described in the UNESCO World Heritage Convention, established in 1972. Palestine accepted the convention on 8 December 2011, making its historical sites eligible for inclusion on the list. , there are three World Heritage Sites in Palestine, all them cultural sites.

Palestine's first site, Birthplace of Jesus: Church of the Nativity and the Pilgrimage Route, Bethlehem, was inscribed on the list at the 36th session of the World Heritage Committee, held in Saint Petersburg, Russia in 2012.

, two of the three of Palestine's World Heritage Sites are on UNESCO's List of World Heritage in Danger. The Birthplace of Jesus: Church of the Nativity and Pilgrimage Route site was also on the Danger list from 2012 to 2019.

The Old City of Jerusalem and its walls is also listed by UNESCO as a World Heritage Site. It was proposed as a site by Jordan. The site is not assigned to a state on the UNESCO listing. In 2011 UNESCO stated "The Old City of Jerusalem is inscribed on the World Heritage List and the List of World Heritage in Danger. UNESCO continues to work to ensure respect for the outstanding universal value of the cultural heritage of the Old City of Jerusalem. This position is reflected on UNESCO’s official website (www.unesco.org). In line with relevant UN resolutions, East Jerusalem remains part of the occupied Palestinian territory, and the status of Jerusalem must be resolved in permanent status negotiations."

World Heritage Sites
Site; named after the World Heritage Committee's official designation
Location; at city, regional, or provincial level and geocoordinates
Criteria; as defined by the World Heritage Committee
Area; in hectares and acres. If available, the size of the buffer zone has been noted as well. A lack of value implies that no data has been published by UNESCO
Year; during which the site was inscribed to the World Heritage List
Description; brief information about the site, including reasons for qualifying as an endangered site, if applicable

World Heritage Sites located in East Jerusalem

Tentative list
In addition to sites inscribed on the World Heritage List, member states can maintain a list of tentative sites that they may consider for nomination. Nominations for the World Heritage List are only accepted if the site was previously listed on the tentative list. As of 2020, Palestine recorded 13 sites on its tentative list. The sites, along with the year they were included on the tentative list are:

See also
Tourism in Palestine
List of World Heritage Sites in Western Asia
List of World Heritage Sites in the Arab States

References

External links
 UNESCO World Heritage Centre – Palestine

Palestine
 
Palestine
World Heritage Sites